Doba may refer to:

Places

Africa
 Doba (woreda), a district in Ethiopia
 Doba, Ethiopia, the major city in Doba ward
 Doba, Ghana a community in Ghana
 Doba, Chad, a city in Chad
 Doba, a former sub-prefecture of Logone Oriental Region, Chad
 Doba Airport, a public use airport located near Doba, Logone Oriental, Chad
 Roman Catholic Diocese of Doba, a diocese in Doba in the Ecclesiastical province of N'Djamena, Chad
 Doba Project, an oil development project in the Doba region
 Doba, Ivory Coast, a town and commune in the San-Pédro Department, Ivory Coast
 RAF El Daba, a village and World War II airfield in Egypt often referred to as Doba Airfield

Asia
 Doba, Tibet, a village in the Tibet Autonomous Region of China
 Doba, a populated place on Basilaki Island, in the Louisiade Archipelago, Milne Bay Province, Papua New Guinea

Europe
 Doba, Hungary, a village in Veszprém county, Hungary
 Doba, Satu Mare, a commune in Satu Mare County, Romania
 Doba, Warmian-Masurian Voivodeship, Poland
 DOBA Faculty of Applied Business and Social Studies Maribor, a university in Slovenia
 Doba, a village in Dobrin, Sălaj County, Romania
 Doba, a village in Pleșoiu Commune, Olt County, Romania

People 
 Bill Doba (born 1940), an American football coach
 Aleksander Doba (born 1946), a Polish kayaker

Other uses 
 Doba (drum), a Romanian musical instrument
 Doba language, a Central Sudanic language spoken in Chad

See also